The History of Geneva dates from before the Roman occupation in the second century BC. Now the principal French-speaking city of Switzerland, Geneva was an independent city state from the Middle Ages until the end of the 18th century. John Calvin was the Protestant leader of the city in the 16th century.

Antiquity and Early Middle Ages 
Geneva first appears in history as an Allobrogian border town, fortified against the Celtic Helvetii tribe, which the Romans took in 121 BC.

In 58 BC, Caesar, Roman governor of Gaul, destroyed the Rhône bridge at Geneva and built a 19-mile earthwork from Lake Geneva to the Jura Mountains in order to block the migration of the Helvetii, who "attempted, sometimes by day, more often by night, to break through, either by joining boats together and making a number of rafts (ratis), or by fording the Rhône where the depth of the stream was least" (De Bello Gallico, I, 8). Then he helped establish Geneva as a Roman city (vicus and then civitas) by setting up camp there and significantly increasing its size.

In 443, Geneva was taken by Burgundy, and with the latter fell to the Franks in 534. In 888 the town was part of the new Kingdom of Burgundy, and with it was taken over in 1033 by the German Emperor.

In 563, according to the writings of Gregory of Tours and Marius Aventicensis, a tsunami swept along Lake Geneva, destroying many settlements, and causing numerous deaths in Geneva. Simulations indicate that this Tauredunum event was most likely caused by a massive landslide near where the Rhone flows into the lake, which caused a wave eight meters high to reach Geneva within 70 minutes.

Early Christian ministry 
Geneva became an episcopal seat in the 4th century.

According to legendary accounts found in the works of Gregorio Leti ("Historia Genevrena", Amsterdam, 1686) and Besson ("Memoires pour l'histoire ecclésiastique des diocèses de Genève, Tarantaise, Aoste et Maurienne", Nancy, 1739; new ed. Moutiers, 1871), Geneva was Christianised by Dionysius Areopagita and Paracodus, two of the 72 disciples, in the time of Domitian. Dionysius went thence to Paris and Paracodus became the first Bishop of Geneva – but the legend is based on an error, as is that which makes St. Lazarus the first Bishop of Geneva, arising out of the similarity between the Latin names Genava (Geneva) and Genua (Genoa, in northern Italy). The so-called "Catalogue de St. Pierre", which names St. Diogenus (Diogenes) as the first Bishop of Geneva, is unreliable.

A letter of St. Eucherius to Salvius makes it almost certain that the name of the first bishop (c. 400) was Isaac. In 440, Salonius appears as Bishop of Geneva; he was a son of Eucherius, to whom the latter dedicated his Instructiones'; he took part in the Council of Orange (441), Vaison (442) and Arles (about 455), and is supposed to be the author of two small commentaries, In parabolas Salomonis and on Ecclesisastis. Little is known about the following bishops:
Theoplastus (about 475), to whom Sidonius Apollinaris addressed a letter.
Dormitianus (before 500), under whom the Burgundian Princess Sedeleuba, a sister of Queen Clotilde, had the remains of the martyr and St. Victor of Soleure transferred to Geneva, where she built a basilica in his honour.
St. Maximus (about 512-41), a friend of Avitus, Archbishop of Vienne and Cyprian of Toulon, with whom he was in correspondence.
Bishop Pappulus sent the priest Thoribiusas his substitute to the Synod of Orléans (541).
Bishop Salonius II is only known from the signatures of the Synods of Lyon (570) and Paris (573) and Bishop Cariatto, installed by King Guntram in 584, was present at the two Synods of Valence and Macon in 585.

High and Late Middle Ages 

From the beginning, the bishopric of Geneva operated as a suffragan of the Archbishopric of Vienne. The bishops of Geneva had the status of prince of the Holy Roman Empire from 1154, but had to maintain a long struggle for their independence against the guardians (advocati) of the see, the counts of Geneva and later the counts of the House of Savoy. It is some time around 1219 that the Counts of Geneva completely quit the city and moved their capital to Annecy.

In 1290, the latter obtained the right of installing the vice-dominus of the diocese, the title of "Vidame of Geneva" was granted by Amadeus V, Count of Savoy in the name of the Holy See (by the Foreign relations of the Holy See) to the counts of the House of Candia under count François de Candie of Chambéry-Le-Vieux a Chatellaine of the Savoy, this official exercised minor jurisdiction in the town in the bishop's absence.

In 1387, Bishop Adhémar Fabry granted the town its great charter, the basis of its communal self-government, which every bishop on his accession was expected to confirm. The line of the counts of Geneva ended in 1394, and the House of Savoy came into possession of their territory, assuming after 1416 the title of Duke. The new dynasty sought to bring the city of Geneva under their power, particularly by elevating members of their own family to the episcopal see. In 1447 Antipope Felix V, who was also Duke of Savoy, appointed himself as bishop of Geneva, and the Savoy dynasty ruled the episcopal see until 1490, when popular pressure compelled the dynasty to renounce the title of bishop.

In 1457 a major government organ was established in Geneva, known as the Grand Council, which first consisted of 50 deputies and later their number was raised to 200. The members of the Grand Council were elected every year in early February. The Grand Council represented the citizens of Geneva and decided on political matters and also elected the bishops of Geneva after that position was renounced by the Savoy dynasty in 1490. This same council gradually became estranged from the Duke of Savoy.

A new cause of friction between the Grand Council and the Duke of Savoy evolved in 1513, when Charles III decided to appoint his cousin John of Savoy as bishop and even secured Papal endorsement. Despite being bishop of Geneva, the new Savoy bishop resided most of the time in Pignerol in Piedmont, another factor enhancing the alienation between the people in Geneva and the Savoy dynasty.

In 1519, the Grand Council of Geneva attempted to forge an alliance with Fribourg, but the Duke of Savoy responded with invasion of the republic, which led to the execution of Philibert Berthelier and suspension of the Grand Council's powers. However, after that date the power of Savoy over Geneva gradually declined. In 1521 Jean of Savoy died, and the Grand Council appealed to Pope Leo X to appoint the next bishop, who then appointed Pierre de la Baume. In addition, the Duke of Savoy also tried to reconcile his political ambitions with local Genevan patriotism, and in 1523 marched into Geneva in a ceremony designated to appease its population, and tried to gain the support of the Geneva merchants by promising them a share in the trade with the Kingdom of Portugal (his wife's country of origin) and its territories in Brazil. However, the independence faction in Geneva did not accept these gestures. Another political crisis occurred in 1524, when the treasurer of Geneva, Bernard Boulet, a supporter of Savoy rule, was accused by the Grand Council of embezzlement. He reacted to the accusations by appealing to Charles III to curtail the powers of the council once more, to which the Duke responded by confiscating assets held by council members in other territories under Savoy rule.

In January 1525 the council appealed to the Pope to excommunicate Charles III. The deputies' attempt to enlist the support of the bishop Pierre de la Baume for their cause failed, and the Pope rejected their request. However, Charles III feared another rebellion, and in September 1525 made another proposal of power-sharing to the Grand Council of Geneva, which the council endorsed by 53–42. However, Charles III was not satisfied with this and started a new invasion of Geneva in order to destroy the pro-independence faction. The pro-independence faction fled to Fribourg, and in December 1525 the Grand Council acknowledged Charles III as the true sovereign of Geneva (a session known as the "Assembly of Halberds"). However, members of the pro-independence faction began their own clandestine campaign to enlist support for their cause, and in February 1526 gained the support of bishop Pierre de la Baume. Elections to the Grand Council took place the same month and led to a pro-independence majority that voted to break away from Savoy rule. Eventually the Grand Council succeeded in protecting the liberty of its citizens by establishing union with the Old Swiss Confederacy, by concluding on February 20, 1526 a treaty of alliance with Bern and Fribourg. On March 12, representatives of the other Swiss cantons appeared before the Grand Council in Geneva and swore to protect that republic as part of their confederation.

Reformation 

Geneva, home of Calvinism, was one of the great centres of the Protestant Reformation. While Bern favoured the introduction of the new teaching and demanded liberty of preaching for the Reformers Guillaume Farel and Antoine Froment, Catholic Fribourg renounced in 1533 its allegiance with Geneva.

Background to the Protestant Reformation 

In 1523, the first Protestants, refugees from France, arrived in Geneva. The new theology soon became very popular. The power of the Catholic Church in Geneva was further weakened following an abortive rebellion in 1526 by the priests in protest of the alliance with Bern and Fribourg. In July 1527, all Catholic priests of noble descent were expelled from Geneva due to their pro-Savoy sentiments. The bishop fled from Geneva to Gex in August 1527, in order to save himself from capture or assassination by Charles III's agents, but still remained officially the bishop of Geneva. The bishop supported for a while the independence of Geneva, but later colluded with Charles III to use his influence to bring about the annulment of the 1526 treaty of alliance. As a result, the Grand Council decided in January 1528 to adhere to the Lutheran faith, and the Pope responded by excommunicating the people of Geneva. Even though Geneva was still under the nominal jurisdiction of a Catholic bishop, the Grand Council took advantage of his absence and initiated a gradual reform in worship along Lutheran lines.

Following the 1526 alliance treaty, Charles III of Savoy was not willing to concede defeat in Geneva, and constantly plotted to take over that city again. The fear of Swiss intervention kept him at bay, but he encouraged sporadic acts of violence against Geneva such as acts of robbery and destruction of goods intended for Geneva. The bishop of Geneva, no longer residing within that city, participated in plans to overthrow its independence. Some of the knights who were interested in capturing Geneva for Charles III organized in an unofficial organization termed the Order of the Spoon.  The knights of that group attempted an abortive invasion of Geneva by climbing on the city wall with ladders on March 25, 1529, an event to be known as "day of the ladders". In addition, the Duke of Savoy sought to convince the other Swiss republics to abrogate their alliance with Geneva, and to that end managed to enlist the support of Francis I of France and of Emperor Charles V. The Emperor Charles V tried to convince the Grand Council of Geneva to return to the Catholic Church, and on July 16, 1529 even wrote a letter to that effect in his own handwriting, but the council of Geneva rejected the plea and Charles V became determined to act with force. The Swiss Federation was alarmed by these developments, and in May 1530 a joint delegation from Bern, Fribourg, Zurich, Basel and Solothurn suggested to the Grand Council the abrogation of the 1526 alliance treaty in exchange for looser cooperation. The Grand Council rejected the offer and decided to oppose any attempt to restore Geneva to Savoy rule.

On June 24, 1530, the Grand Council arrested a public prosecutor named Mandolia, who was a supporter of duke Charles III, and this irritated bishop Baume, who retaliated by arresting Genevan merchants in Gex, where he now resided. He also made a pact with the Knights of the Spoon, and on August 20, issued an episcopal decree ordering them to wage war in order to restore Geneva to its rightful rulers. On September 30, the attack began, as the Knights of the Spoon were joined by the forces of Charles III, reaching up to 800 soldiers total. The Genevan army was only about 600 men strong, but on October 10 reinforcements of about 10,000 men strong arrived from Bern and Fribourg.  In addition, Emperor Charles V, even though a supporter of Savoy interests, refused to participate in that war, and the invading army was forced to withdraw. Following the Savoyard withdrawal, a peace treaty was concluded between Geneva and bishop Baume, by which the Grand Council in Geneva released Mandolia from prison and the bishop released the Genevans arrested at Gex.

During the Second War of Kappel in October 1531, Geneva was politically divided, as the government of Bern requested military aid for the Protestants of Zurich, while Fribourg requested that for the Catholic party. The Grand Council of Geneva was torn between the two parties, but decided to split its forces and assist both simultaneously. Following the defeat of Zurich in the war, Fribourg renounced its alliance with Geneva. As a result, Charles III of Savoy renewed his plans of capturing Geneva. This alarmed the governments of Bern and Fribourg to the point of suggesting to Geneva to renounce the alliance treaty of 1526 and accept Savoy rule, which the council of Geneva rejected.

In June 1532, street skirmishes between Catholics and Protestants broke out, and the government of Fribourg threatened to tear up its alliance with Geneva if Protestant practices were permitted. The government of Bern, however, pressured the Grand Council of Geneva to allow Protestant preaching. The authority of the Catholic bishop was no longer recognized by the people and institutions of Geneva, but at first they refused to commit their city to the Protestant cause, for fear of antagonizing the Catholic rulers of adjacent kingdoms as well as the Catholic priests within Geneva.

Compromise between Catholics and Protestants 
The Catholic priests and monks in Geneva remained a significant social force to reckon with, and used their influence in order to bring about the expulsion of the Protestant preachers, and on March 28, 1533 even tried to incite the Catholic masses to massacre the Protestants - a scheme that failed due to emotions of city solidarity and Grand Council efforts to restore the peace. The Grand Council was cautious in its policies, and attempted a middle course between the two factions. As part of that middle course, it yielded to Protestant demands by approving in March 1533 the publication of the Bible in French, but only a conservative translation that did not appeal to Protestant sentiments and was acceptable to the Catholics in the republic. The Grand Council also had to take into consideration the need to remain in alliance with both Catholic and Protestant cantons. In February 1533, Fribourg openly revoked the alliance treaty of 1526, and later even made plans to invade Geneva.

In order to keep the peace between Catholics and Protestants as well as a policy of neutrality between the Catholic and Protestant powers, the Grand Council of Geneva on March 30, 1533 passed a statute of compromise which permitted every Genevan to choose his religious affiliation, while prohibiting open attacks on Catholic doctrines and practices and all religious preaching in open places for both parties. Eating meat on Fridays was prohibited for both parties. However, neither had the intention of abiding by the statute, and street riots broke out from time to time.

Protestant triumph 
Even after the ousting of bishop la Baume from Geneva, the triumph of Protestantism was not assured, as the Catholic faction within that city conspired with Fribourg to act for the return of the Catholic bishop to Geneva. La Baume himself was reluctant at first, but Pope Clement VII pressured him to accept. On July 3, 1533 - with military aid from Fribourg - the bishop once again entered Geneva in a procession. The Grand Council demanded from the bishop to honor the traditional freedoms of the republic, which he promised to uphold. However, soon the bishop started arresting conspicuous Protestants in Geneva, and there were rumors that he intended to remove the prisoners to Fribourg and placed beyond the Grand Council's reach. On July 12 riots broke out, and the bishop yielded to popular clamor and delivered the prisoners to the Council's custody. Fearing for his life, the bishop decided to flee the city, which he did on July 14, this time never to return, while moving his headquarters to Arbois and later to Chambery. However, de la Baume officially remained the bishop of Geneva and Catholic priests and monks still remained a strong faction within the city. The bishop still tried to exercise his jurisdiction over Geneva and on October 24, 1533 wrote a letter to the council, demanding it to stop Protestant preaching in Geneva, which the council refused to do.

Following the bishop's flight, the influence of Protestant preachers in Geneva increased, and this was achieved to the chagrin of the local Catholic priests due to pressure from Bern, which threatened to revoke the 1526 alliance treaty unless freedom was granted to Protestants. In addition, the exiled bishop was gradually losing popularity also with the Catholic sections of Genevan society due to numerous attempts to meddle by proxy with the republic's judicial affairs, which the Genevans viewed as attacks on the liberties of their city. As a result of that, the Grand Council agreed in January 1534 to allow the trials of clergyman by secular authorities. The Catholic influence within Geneva was further diminished following the flight on July 30, 1534 of part of its Catholic population due to the rising tensions between Catholics and Protestants, and at the February 1535 election to the Grand Council, a Protestant majority was secured. Bishop de la Baume, seeing that Geneva was becoming Protestant, issued a decree on June 13, 1535 prohibiting trade with Geneva on pain of excommunication. The Grand Council, even though consisted of a Protestant majority, still refrained from proclaiming the city as Protestant, for fear of reprisals from Catholic neighboring kingdoms. In order to compel the council to make that move, Protestant leaders such as Guillaume Farel began agitating the crowds to demolish icons and throw the wafers of the eucharist to the ground in Catholic churches. As a measure of compromise between the two groups, the Grand Council resolved on August 10, 1535, to prohibit the breaking of icons on one hand and to prohibit the celebration of Mass on the other. This move increased further the flight of Catholics from the city into Savoy territories. Following another unsuccessful invasion of Geneva by Savoy forces in October 1535, which ended in a Savoy defeat at Gingins, the Grand Council decided on February 3, 1536 on the destruction of all castles around Geneva in order not to allow any princes another pretext for invading their city.

On May 21, 1536, the Genevans declared themselves Protestant by taking a public oath of allegiance to the Lutheran faith where all residents took part, and proclaimed their city a republic. This move was in the making for a long time, but was delayed for fears of Savoy invasion. However, the French invasion of Savoy territories earlier that year had removed that obstacle.

The Protestant leader John Calvin was based in Geneva from 1536 to his death in 1564 (save for an exile from 1538 to 1541) and became the spiritual leader of the city, a position created by the Grand Council as the city turned Protestant. Geneva became a center of Protestant activity, producing works such as the Genevan Psalter, though there were often tensions between Calvin and the city's civil authorities. Calvin also supported the admission into Geneva of Protestant refugees, which some circles strongly opposed.

Though the city proper remained a Protestant stronghold, a large part of the historic diocese returned to Catholicism in the early seventeenth century under St. Francis de Sales. Geneva has played a historical role in the spread of Protestantism.
In addition to becoming a Protestant state, Geneva in the 16th century also became a kind of welfare state, as a general state hospital was established in 1535 by the wealthy Protestant Claude Salomon. A centralized education system was established with the cooperation of John Calvin.

In 1584, Geneva strengthened its ties to the Swiss Confederacy with a separate "eternal treaty" with the Protestant city cantons of Bern and Zürich. But the five Catholic cantons blocked any suggestions of full accession of Geneva to the Confederacy.

17th century
In the 1580s, the conflict with Savoy intensified once again after the accession of Charles Emmanuel I.
In the event known as L'Escalade of the night of 11 December 1602 (Old Style),
the Savoiards attempted to take the city by stealth, climbing over the walls using black ladders. They were discovered and repelled.

The city became increasingly aristocratic during the 17th century, to the point where it became almost impossible for outsiders to acquire citizenship.
The common assembly (Conseil général)  became almost powerless, to the benefit of the 
lesser council (Petit Conseil) and the council of the two-hundred (Conseil des Deux-Cents), which were filled with members of the powerful families in nepotistic appointments.
Society was divided between the Citoyens, who were either members of the old patriciate or offsprings of Bourgeois born in Geneva, and had full citizenship, the Bourgeois, who were either naturalized citizens or offsprings of Bourgeois not born in the city,  the Natifs, Geneva-born descendants of residents without citizenship, and the mere Habitants, non-citizens permitted residence in exchange for a fee. Finally, Sujets were the population of a number of nearby villages controlled by the city.

18th century 
Throughout this century, Geneva was plagued by strife between the Francophone oligarchy and radical populist opponents. The elite dominated the councils of the republic, and used their position to raise indirect taxes which hurt the poor more than the rich. They were accused of being pro-French libertine rentiers, committed neither to the republic nor to Calvinism, whereas the opposition subscribed to strict Calvinism and populist republicanism.

Conflict between these factions led to rioting in 1734–1737, which was settled after the diplomatic intervention of France and Geneva's two Swiss allies, Bern and Zurich. In the 1750s the opposition, led by watchmaker Jacques François Deluc (1698–1780), began to call themselves the représentants (representatives). They wanted the General Council (AKA the Grand Council, Geneva's legislature) to more truly represent the people and to re-assert its power over the aristocratic ministers on the Council of Twenty-Five (the executive council). This did not happen, but further unrest in 1767 led to another French-brokered agreement between elitists and populists.

Meanwhile, a quarrel between French-speaking intellectuals whipped up the unrest still further. A piece written by Jean le Rond d'Alembert appeared in 1757 in volume 7 of the Encyclopédie criticising the puritanism of Geneva's Calvinist pastors and advocating the adoption of the enlightened arts as in France. Jean Jacques Rousseau fell out with him and other philosophes such as Denis Diderot and Voltaire over this, advocating stricter morals and siding with the radicals, although not going so far as to advocate democracy.

Finally, in the abortive Geneva Revolution of 1782, revolutionary ideologues and working-class activists demanding a broader franchise seized the state. Popular representatives were elected to an executive committee which proceeded to enact wide-ranging reforms. However France, Bern and Savoy sent a military force to Geneva, causing the leading revolutionaries to flee to nearby Neuchâtel (then under Prussia), saying they would refound Geneva elsewhere along with industrious fellow-citizens. The invaders imposed a new constitution on Geneva entrenching the aristocracy. This caused many Genevans to emigrate and try to build a new Geneva at, for example, Waterford, Cologne or Brussels. Many radical émigrés went on to do great things, such as participating in the French Revolution (1789–1799).

During the French Revolution period, aristocratic and democratic factions again contended for control of Geneva.  In 1798, however, France, then under the Directory, annexed Geneva and its surrounding territory.

19th century 

In 1802, the diocese was united with that of Chambéry. The defeat of Napoleonic armies and liberation of Geneva in 1813 by the Austrian general Ferdinand von Bubna und Littitz restored its independence. At the Congress of Vienna of 1814–15, the territory of Geneva was extended to cover 15 Savoyard and six French parishes, with more than 16,000 Catholics; at the same time it was admitted to the Swiss Confederation. The Congress expressly provided—and the same proviso was included in the Treaty of Turin (16 March 1816)—that in these territories transferred to Geneva the Catholic religion was to be protected, and that no changes were to be made in existing conditions without the approval of the Holy See. The city's neutrality was guaranteed by the Congress. Pius VII in 1819 united the city of Geneva and 20 parishes with the Diocese of Lausanne, while the rest of the ancient Diocese of Geneva (outside of Switzerland) was reconstituted, in 1822, as the French Diocese of Annecy.  The Great Council of Geneva (cantonal council) afterwards ignored the responsibilities thus undertaken; in imitation of Napoleon's "Organic Articles", it insisted upon the Placet, or previous approval of publication, for all papal documents. Catholic indignation ran high at the civil measures taken against Marilley, the parish priest of Geneva and later bishop of the see, and at the Kulturkampf, which obliged them to contribute to the budget of the Protestant Church and to that of the Old Catholic Church, without providing any public aid for Catholicism.

20th century 
On 30 June 1907, aided by strong Catholic support, Geneva adopted a separation of church and state. The Protestant faith received a one-time compensatory sum of 800,000 Swiss francs, while other faiths received nothing. Since then the Canton of Geneva has given aid to no creed from either state or municipal revenues.

The international status of the city was highlighted after World War I when Geneva became the seat of the League of Nations in 1919—notably through the work of the Federal Council member Gustav Ador and of Swiss diplomat William Rappard, who was one of the founders of the Graduate Institute of International and Development Studies, Europe's oldest graduate school of international and development studies. Furthermore, the International School of Geneva, the oldest currently operating International School in the world, was founded in 1924 by senior members of the League of Nations and the International Labor Office.

In the wake of the war, a class struggle in Switzerland grew and culminated in a general strike throughout the country—beginning on Armistice Day, 11 November 1918, and directed from the German-speaking part of the nation. However the prevailing friendliness toward France in Geneva moderated its effect upon that city.

On 9 November 1932, several small Fascist-inspired political parties, such as the National Union, attacked Socialist leaders, which action led to a later demonstration of the Left against the Fascists. On that occasion, young recruits in the Swiss Army fired without warning into a crowd, leaving thirteen dead and 63 wounded. As a result, a new general strike was called several days later in protest.

After World War II, the European headquarters of the United Nations and the seats of dozens of international organizations were installed in Geneva, resulting in the development of tourism and of business.

In the 1960s, Geneva became one of the first parts of Switzerland in which the rights movements achieved a certain measure of success. It was the third canton to grant women's suffrage on the cantonal and communal levels.

See also 

 Timeline of Geneva
Bourgeois of Geneva
Outline of Switzerland
Calvin Auditory, a chapel in Geneva that played a significant role in the Reformation
Lausanne and Geneva bishopric(s)

Notes

Further reading

Published in the 19th century
 
 

Published in the 20th century
 
 Adda Bruemmer Bozeman, Regional Conflicts Around Geneva: An Inquiry into the Origins, Nature, and Implications of the Neutralised Zone of Savoy and of the Customs-Free Zones of Gex and Upper Savoy. Hoover Library on War, Revolution and Peace series, no. 22; Stanford University Press, 1949.
 Jean de Senarclens, "Geneva: Historic Guide". Editions du Tricorne, 1995, .

Published in the 21st century
 Histoire de Genève (2006) French f

 
Populated places established in the 1st millennium BC
Associates of the Old Swiss Confederacy
Former theocracies
Reformation in Switzerland